The 1999 Race of Champions took place on December 5 at Gran Canaria. It was the 12th running of the event, and the eighth running at Gran Canaria. It was the first year for the new Nations' Cup Competition, which saw teams of three competitors - a rally driver, a circuit racing driver and a motorcyclist - team up to represent their nation and compete for national glory.

The vehicles used were the Peugeot 306 Maxi, The Mitsubishi Lancer Evolution V WRC, the Toyota Corolla WRC and the ROC Buggy.

The individual competition was won by Didier Auriol for a fourth time, whilst the inaugural Nations' Cup was won by Finland with JJ Lehto, Tommi Mäkinen and Kari Tiainen.

Participants

Race of Champions

Nations Cup

 Toivonen replaced Danny Sullivan in the All-Stars team.

Legends Race
 Walter Röhrl & Hannu Mikkola eliminated in the First Round.

International Masters

 Flavio Alonso and Luis Mónzon qualified for being the finalists for the Spanish Rally Masters competition.
 Toni Gardemeister was invited but could not attend.
 Michael Guest, Krzysztof Holowczyc, Markko Martin and Adruzilo Lopes were eliminated in the first round.

Race of Champions

Nations' Cup

 Germany & Italy eliminated in the first round.

References

External links
Information sourced from http://www.atodomotor.com/pagina/ROC.html

1999
1999 in Spanish motorsport
International sports competitions hosted by Spain
1999,Race of Champions